Kapshi Estate was a jagir in India during the British Raj. It was under the Kolhapur-Dekkan Residency in the Bombay Presidency, and later the Deccan States Agency.

It had a population of 3,414 in 1901.

History
The father of the founder of the estate was Shrimant Senapati Malojirao Ghorpade, who died in the battle of Sangmeshwar against the Mughals. A general of the Maratha army, he was granted the title 'Senapati', a hereditary title of nobility used in the Maratha Empire, and became the first ruler of Kapshi in the second half of the 17th century.

See also
 Kolhapur State
 List of Indian princely states

References

Kolhapur district
Quasi-princely estates of India